The 2013 Australian federal election to elect the members of the 44th Parliament of Australia took place on 7 September 2013. The centre-right Liberal/National Coalition opposition led by Opposition leader Tony Abbott of the Liberal Party of Australia and Coalition partner the National Party of Australia, led by Warren Truss, defeated the incumbent centre-left Labor Party government of Prime Minister Kevin Rudd in a landslide. Labor had been in government for six years since being elected in the 2007 election. This election marked the end of the Rudd-Gillard-Rudd Labor government and the start of the 9 year long Abbott-Turnbull-Morrison Liberal-National Coalition government. Abbott was sworn in by the Governor-General, Quentin Bryce, as Australia's new Prime Minister on 18 September 2013, along with the Abbott Ministry. The 44th Parliament of Australia opened on 12 November 2013, with the members of the House of Representatives and territory senators sworn in. The state senators were sworn in by the next Governor-General Peter Cosgrove on 7 July 2014, with their six-year terms commencing on 1 July.

The proclamation dissolving the House of Representatives and formally beginning the election period had been issued by Governor-General Bryce on 5 August 2013. The writs of election were subsequently issued by Bryce for the election of members of the House of Representatives and territory senators, and by the state governors for the senators for each state.

Voting in Australia's federal elections has been compulsory since 1925. For the House of Representatives, a preferential ballot system has been in use since 1919, in single-member seats. For the Senate—the proportionally representative upper house—a single transferable vote system has been in use since 1949, with optional group voting tickets since 1984. Elections are conducted by the Australian Electoral Commission (AEC).

A special half-Senate election was conducted on 5 April 2014 in Western Australia as a result of 1,375 lost ballot papers.

Key dates
Governor-General accepted Kevin Rudd's advice to dissolve Parliament and hold a general election – 4 August 2013
Prorogation of 43rd Parliament – 5:29 pm Monday 5 August 2013
Dissolution of House of Representatives – 5:30 pm Monday 5 August 2013
Issue of writs – Monday 5 August 2013
Close of rolls – 8 pm Monday 12 August 2013
Close of candidate nominations – 12 noon Thursday 15 August 2013
Declaration of candidate nominations – 12 noon Friday 16 August 2013
Election day or Polling day – Saturday 7 September 2013
Swearing-in of 44th Parliament – Wednesday 18 September 2013
Last day for the return of writs – Monday 13 November 2013
Deadline for first meeting of the 44th Parliament – Wednesday 13 December 2013

On 30 January 2013, the then Prime Minister Julia Gillard had announced the election would be held on 14 September. However, following a leadership ballot in June 2013, she was replaced as leader and Prime Minister by Rudd, who then abandoned the originally planned date. A referendum on amending the constitution to allow the federal government to directly fund local councils, which was initially planned to be held on the same day as the federal election, could not go ahead on the date announced by Rudd. This is because Section 128 of the Constitution of Australia requires that a referendum be submitted to electors between two and six months after its passage through Parliament. As early voting started on 20 August it could not be submitted then.

43rd Parliament

House of Representatives

At the 2010 federal election, Labor and the Liberal/National Coalition each won 72 seats in the 150-seat House of Representatives, four short of the requirement for majority government, resulting in the first hung parliament since the 1940 federal election. On the crossbench, one member of the Australian Greens, one member of the National Party of Western Australia and four independent members held the balance of power. After gaining the support of the Greens and three independents on confidence and supply votes, Labor was able to form a minority government with 76 seats, the smallest possible margin in the 150-seat House.

Changes in House numbers
On 24 November 2011, Harry Jenkins resigned as Speaker of the House of Representatives and returned to the Labor backbench. Later, that day, Deputy Speaker Peter Slipper was elected Speaker and quit the Liberal National Party to become an independent. This changed nominal confidence and supply numbers on the floor of the house from 75–74 to 76–73. In January 2012, Andrew Wilkie withdrew his guarantee of confidence to the incumbent government, changing numbers to 75–73 in the event of his abstention, or 75–74 in the event of his support for a vote of no confidence in the government. In April 2012, Labor's Craig Thomson moved to the crossbenches as an independent MP, and in May, WA National Tony Crook moved from the crossbenches to the Nationals, but did not join the Coalition. Changes brought the government to 71 seats, the Coalition 72 seats and seven crossbenchers. On 9 October 2012, after an unsuccessful vote of no confidence in the speakership, Slipper resigned as Speaker and was replaced by Labor Deputy Speaker Anna Burke. Slipper remained an independent MP.

Pendulum

Senate

Before the election, the 76-seat Senate was made up of senators from the Coalition (34), Australian Labor Party (31), Australian Greens (9), Democratic Labour Party (1) and one independent senator, Nick Xenophon. The Greens held the sole balance of power. Previously the Greens had held a shared balance of power with the Family First Party and Xenophon.

Of the 76 Senate seats, 40 are contested. This corresponds to half of each state's allocation as well as both senators from the two major territories. Newly elected state senators commenced their terms on 1 July 2014 and the senators of the territories began their terms immediately after their elections.

Election period
On 30 January 2013, at a speech at the National Press Club, Prime Minister Julia Gillard announced the election would be held on Saturday 14 September 2013, although the Governor-General was not formally advised and no writ of election was issued. Kevin Rudd succeeded Julia Gillard as Prime Minister on 27 June 2013.

The Broadcasting Services Act 1992 was checked by various commercial broadcasting media outlets and media councils as a result of Gillard's announcement. The Act says, in part,

and

This is interpreted as "equal time, over time" rather than equal time in the same broadcast, and that this requirement began with the announcement on 30 January 2013.

Retiring MPs and senators
The terms of Members of the House of Representatives who did not renominate ended at the dissolution of the parliament (5 August 2013).

The terms of Senators who did not renominate ended on 30 June 2014, unless they represented the Australian Capital Territory or the Northern Territory, in which case their term ended on the day before polling day (6 September 2013). That date also applies to territory senators who contest the election but are defeated.

Members and senators who chose not to renominate are as follows:

Independent
 Rob Oakeshott MP (Lyne, NSW) – announced retirement 26 June 2013
 Tony Windsor MP (New England, NSW) – announced retirement 26 June 2013

Labor
Greg Combet MP (Charlton, NSW) – announced retirement 29 June 2013
Simon Crean MP (Hotham, VIC) – announced retirement 1 July 2013
 Craig Emerson MP (Rankin, Qld) – announced retirement 26 June 2013
 Martin Ferguson MP (Batman, Vic) – announced retirement 29 May 2013
 Peter Garrett MP (Kingsford Smith, NSW) – announced retirement 26 June 2013
 Steve Gibbons MP (Bendigo, Vic) – announced retirement 29 August 2011
 Julia Gillard MP (Lalor, Vic) – announced retirement 26 June 2013
 Sharon Grierson MP (Newcastle, NSW) – announced retirement 18 July 2012
 Harry Jenkins MP (Scullin, Vic) – announced retirement 26 July 2012
 Kirsten Livermore MP (Capricornia, Qld) – announced retirement 27 November 2012
 Robert McClelland MP (Barton, NSW) – announced retirement 29 January 2013
 Nicola Roxon MP (Gellibrand, VIC) – announced retirement 2 February 2013
 Stephen Smith MP (Perth, WA) – announced retirement 27 June 2013
 Senator Mark Bishop (WA) – announced retirement 15 April 2013
 Senator Trish Crossin (NT) – lost preselection 28 January 2013
 Senator John Hogg (Qld) – announced retirement 10 August 2012

Liberal
 Joanna Gash MP (Gilmore, NSW) – announced retirement 25 January 2012
 Barry Haase MP (Durack, WA) – announced retirement 15 June 2013
 Judi Moylan MP (Pearce, WA) – announced retirement 28 July 2011
 Alby Schultz MP (Hume, NSW) – announced retirement 17 April 2012
 Patrick Secker MP (Barker, SA) – announced retirement on 25 June 2013
 Alex Somlyay MP (Fairfax, Qld) – announced retirement 25 September 2010
 Mal Washer MP (Moore, WA) – announced retirement 28 July 2011
 Senator Sue Boyce (Qld) – announced retirement 8 October 2012
 Senator Alan Eggleston (WA) – announced retirement 9 April 2012
 Senator Gary Humphries (ACT) – lost preselection 23 February 2013

National
 John Forrest MP (Mallee, Vic) – announced retirement 6 March 2013
 Paul Neville MP (Hinkler, Qld) − announced retirement 10 October 2012
 Senator Ron Boswell (Qld) – announced retirement 21 September 2012

WA Nationals
 Tony Crook MP (O'Connor) – announced retirement 9 April 2013

Electoral events timeline
 30 January – Prime Minister Julia Gillard announces planned election date of 14 September 2013.
 2 February – Attorney-General Nicola Roxon announces she will be retiring at the election. Higher Education Minister Senator Chris Evans, whose term was not due to finish until 2017, announces he will be resigning in the near future.
 19 February – Greens leader Christine Milne announces that the alliance agreement with the ALP is over, but her party will not vote against confidence or supply.
 26 February – Gillard announces she will "campaign" in western Sydney for the following week, from Sunday night until Friday.
 19 March – Richard Torbay is forced to resign from the Nationals, forfeiting his candidature for the Division of New England. Barnaby Joyce puts his name forward as a possible replacement candidate, hoping to move from the Senate to the House of Representatives.
 21 March – Former Labor leader, Minister Simon Crean asks Gillard for a party leadership vote, and publicly declares his support for Kevin Rudd. In parliament, the Opposition attempts to suspend standing orders for a no confidence vote and although gaining 73 votes to the government's 71 votes, fails to gain the absolute majority of 76 votes required. Crean is sacked from the ministry. At the leadership ballot no alternative candidate nominates, and Gillard is re-elected as ALP leader unopposed. Rudd supporters Joel Fitzgibbon, Ed Husic, Janelle Saffin and Richard Marles quit their positions in the executive government.
 22 March – Rudd issues a statement that he will never again return to the ALP leadership. Kim Carr, Martin Ferguson and Chris Bowen quit their ministries.
 23 March – Key independent MP Andrew Wilkie warns that ongoing instability within the ALP means the government will have difficulty surviving a vote of confidence when parliament resumes in May.
 2 May – The opposition indicates it will support the Government's National Disability Insurance Scheme policy, including an increase in the Medicare levy from 1.5% to 2%.
 26 June – Independents Rob Oakeshott and Tony Windsor both announce they won't recontest their seats at the election. Kevin Rudd defeats Julia Gillard in another Labor leadership spill by a 57–45 margin. After the spill, Gillard along with ministers Craig Emerson and Peter Garrett announce their retirement at the coming election.
 27 June – Rudd is sworn in as Prime Minister by Governor-General Quentin Bryce, with Anthony Albanese and Chris Bowen sworn in as Deputy Prime Minister and Treasurer respectively. Defence Minister Stephen Smith MP announces his retirement at the coming election.
 29 June – Greg Combet MP announces his retirement at the coming election.
 1 July – The Second Rudd Ministry is sworn in. Simon Crean MP announces his retirement at the coming election.
 1 July – Wikileaks party receives formal registration as a political party.
 22 July – The ALP caucus approves changes to the way the federal parliamentary leader is chosen. The new rules make it more difficult to change leaders and require a ballot of the party membership on contested leadership spills. 
 4 August – Kevin Rudd announces the election date as 7 September 2013.
 5 August – Quentin Bryce, the Governor-General, issues the election writ.
 11 August – The first of three televised leaders debates between Rudd and Abbott is held in Canberra.
 21 August – The second televised leaders debate between Rudd and Abbott is held in Brisbane.
 25 August – The Coalition's formal campaign launch is held in Brisbane.
 27 August – Treasurer Chris Bowen and shadow treasurer Joe Hockey debate at the National Press Club. Later that evening, the third and final televised leaders debate between Rudd and Abbott is held at the Rooty Hill RSL in Sydney.
 28 August – The Coalition releases a document outlining $31.6 billion of proposed budget savings.
 29 August – The Rudd Government releases several costings estimates which it claims show a $10 billion shortfall in the Coalition's claimed savings released the previous day. In a strongly-worded statement, the secretaries of the Department of Treasury and Department of Finance criticise the use of these confidential costings prepared for the government, re-iterating that the assumptions used differ from the costings prepared for the Coalition.
 1 September – Labor's formal campaign launch is held in Brisbane.
 5 September – The Coalition releases its remaining policy costings, claiming a further $9 billion worth of savings, including a $4.5 billion reduction in Australia's foreign aid budget. Later in the day, the Coalition releases a policy document announcing the implementation of an opt-out Internet filter. That evening, Shadow Communications Minister Malcolm Turnbull states that the document was "poorly worded" and released by mistake, and that the Coalition had no such policy.
 7 September (election day) – The Liberal-National coalition defeats the Australian Labor Party with the Coalition expected to win about 90 seats in the House of Representatives. Kevin Rudd conceded defeat and announced that he would not renominate for the ALP's leadership.
 18 September – The Abbott Ministry is sworn in by Governor-General Quentin Bryce.
 17 October – A recount of all "above-the-line" Senate votes made in Western Australia is initiated after an appeal by the WA Greens and the Australian Sports Party is upheld.
 31 October – The AEC announces that it is unable to find 1,375 ballot papers during the WA Senate recount.
 31 October – The AEC declares Clive Palmer the winner of the seat of Fairfax, after two recounts, by a margin of 53 votes. Palmer claims the result vindicates his decision to challenge more than half the ballot papers cast. 
 4 November – The AEC declares the result of the WA Senate recount, awarding the last two seats to the Greens and Australian Sports Party, instead of the ALP and Palmer United Party.
 15 November – The AEC disputes its own declaration of the WA Senate result, by lodging a petition with the Court of Disputed Returns, asking that the WA Senate result be declared null and void.
 January 2014 – Justice Kenneth Hayne, in the Court of Disputed Returns, hears submissions from the AEC and political parties. On 30 January 2014, Hayne reserved his decision.
 20 February 2014 – The Court of Disputed Returns voids the results of the WA Senate election. 
 21 February 2014 – Electoral Commissioner Ed Killesteyn announces his resignation, to take effect on 4 July 2014.

Campaign

The incumbent Labor-led government argued for a need for a "safe pair of hands" to manage an economic shift from mining-oriented growth to something else; while the opposition said that it would prevent a recession that could be caused by a budget deficit. The Sydney Morning Herald suggested both arguments hedged on the mining boom going bust. Rudd officially began the campaign season on 1 September in his hometown of Brisbane. At the rally, he promised tax breaks for small businesses and more work for local contractors on infrastructure projects. He said: "In this election, we are now engaged in the fight of our lives. It is a fight about the values that underpin Australia's future, a fight about our vision for Australia's future. It's a fight about how we go about building Australia's future, a future for the many, not just for the few." He also dismissed the opinion polls that showed him trailing to Abbott in gaining a parliamentary plurality.

Opinion polls

Newspaper endorsements
The press overwhelmingly favoured the Coalition over Labor, with all of News Corp's publications endorsing Tony Abbott's opposition over Kevin Rudd's government, as well as Fairfax's publications such as The Age, The Sydney Morning Herald and The Canberra Times, backing the Coalition over Labor. Fairfax's newspapers, The Sydney Morning Herald and The Canberra Times both considered the need for political stability a primary reason for supporting the Coalition, as well as criticising Labor's continuing infighting and scandals. The Age backed Labor, praising Labor's stewardship of the economy during the global financial crisis and noting that, of the two parties, they were the one with a vision for Australia. The Sunday Age, however, supported the Coalition, rejecting their daily counterpart's editorial that Labor had vision and that the election amounted to choosing a lesser evil, noting that during the election campaign a "genuine contest of ideas [had] not materialised", that "the campaign [had] contained no vision or policy clarion call commanding our attention and demanding our vote" and subsequently that "in the absence of policies and detailed economic information, voter decisiveness will depend on one issue: trust." During this period, various News Corp's papers published numerous front-page articles supporting The Coalition and denigrating Labor. During the campaign, The Daily Telegraph ran front pages depicting Labor as Nazis, displaying a picture of Rudd above a headline telling readers to "Kick this mob out, and, on election day, ran the headline "After 33 days campaigning, 18 babies kissed, 104,275 km flown and six years of an incompetent Labor government, now it's... your turn." The Sunday Telegraph, meanwhile, printed an front-page editorial with the headline "Australia needs Tony". Additionally, The Courier-Mail used a front page to depict Labor as clowns, and ran a headline of "Does This Guy Ever Shut Up" alongside a photo of Rudd during a debate. Similarly, in the weeks preceding the election, the Herald Sun ran the headline "Trust Me" alongside a photo Abbott and on the day of the election ran a front page consisting of the headline "It's Tony's Time" alongside another photo of Abbott.

National daily newspapers

National Sunday newspapers

International and foreign press

Results

House of Representatives

Senate

The Senate has 76 seats. Forty seats were up for election; six in each of the six states, two for the ACT and two for the Northern Territory. The terms of the four senators from the territories commenced on election day. The terms of the six longest-serving state senators ended on 30 June 2014; the terms of the new state senators commenced on 1 July 2014, and were originally supposed to end on 30 June 2020—however, the entire Senate was dissolved at the double-dissolution 2016 election.

The Senate saw the Coalition government on 33 seats with the Labor opposition on 25 seats, the Greens on 10 seats and a crossbench of eight—Palmer United on three seats, with other minor parties and independents on five seats (the LDP's David Leyonhjelm, Family First's Bob Day, Motoring's Ricky Muir and incumbents Nick Xenophon and the DLP's John Madigan). Muir announced he would vote in line with Palmer United. The initial election saw Wayne Dropulich of the Australian Sports Party win a seat in Western Australia, but the subsequent voiding of the result and ensuing special election saw the Palmer United Party gain a third seat. The Coalition government required the support of at least six non-coalition Senators to pass legislation.

A record number of candidates stood at the election. Group voting tickets came under scrutiny because multiple candidates were provisionally elected with the vast majority of their 14.3 per cent quotas coming from the preferences of other parties across the political spectrum. "Preference whisperer" Glenn Druery organised tight cross-preferencing between over 30 minor parties as part of his Minor Party Alliance. Sports' Wayne Dropulich won a Senate seat on a record-low primary vote of 0.2 per cent in Western Australia, his party placing 21st out of 28 groups on primary votes. Motoring's Ricky Muir won a senate seat on a record-low primary vote of 0.5 per cent in Victoria. Family First's Bob Day won a seat on a primary vote of 3.8 per cent in South Australia. All three were involved with the Minor Party Alliance. Previous examples of winning with low vote shares include Family First's Steve Fielding in 2004 on 1.9 per cent in Victoria, the Nuclear Disarmament Party's Robert Wood in 1987 on 1.5 per cent in New South Wales, and the DLP's John Madigan won his seat in 2010 on a primary vote of 2.3 per cent in Victoria. Xenophon and larger parties including the incoming government announced they would look at changes to the GVT system.

Western Australia special Senate election

Most Senate votes cast in Western Australia were subject to a formal recount. During the recount it was determined that  WA Senate ballot papers could not be located. After the final recount the result was duly declared which changed the last two predicted WA Senate spots from Palmer and Labor back to Sports and Green. Mick Keelty, a former AFP Commissioner, was requested by the AEC to investigate the issue of the misplaced ballot papers. On 15 November, the AEC petitioned the High Court, acting as the Court of Disputed Returns, to seek an order from the court that the WA Senate election of all six senators (3 Liberal, 1 Labor, 1 Green, 1 Sport) be declared void. On 18 February 2014, it was announced that the Court of Disputed Returns had found that the result of the Western Australia Senate election should be voided, meaning a fresh election for all six senate vacancies would be required.

On 28 February 2014 it was announced that the half-Senate election in Western Australia would take place on 5 April, which returned 3 Liberal, 1 Labor, 1 Green, 1 Palmer.

Seats changing hands
Members listed in italics did not re-contest their House of Representatives seats at this election.

Result commentary
The Labor Party recorded its lowest two-party preferred vote since 1996 and lowest primary vote since 1931. Kevin Rudd announced his resignation as party leader and confirmed he would not run again in the subsequent leadership election.

With Nova Peris's victory in the Senate election in the Northern Territory, she became the first Aboriginal woman to be elected to parliament. WikiLeaks founder Julian Assange failed to be elected to the Senate after running in Victoria, with his WikiLeaks Party garnering 0.62% of the popular vote. Former Queensland Premier Peter Beattie, standing in the Liberal-held seat of Forde, also failed to enter parliament.

In an unprecedented outcome in Australian electoral history, the Senate result in Western Australia was declared void after the loss of over 1,300 ballot papers, necessitating a fresh election for the Senate in that state.

Aftermath
The Coalition had campaigned on a tough stance on asylum seekers who came to Australia by boat (as had the Labor Party in the final weeks leading up to the election). Immediately after the election, Abbott reiterated his party's promise and announced that his new government would begin Operation Sovereign Borders—which would turn back any vessels carrying asylum seekers—as soon as possible. He also confirmed he would abolish the carbon price that was introduced by the Gillard Government, as well as lower foreign aid by A$4.5 billion.

Reactions

International reactions
 : Fijian Prime Minister Frank Bainimarama congratulated Abbott for his victory and hoped he would normalise relations between the two countries after the 2006 Fijian coup d'état, which caused Australia to sanction Fiji. Bainimarama previously criticised the sanctions and said relations would improve if Abbott replaced Rudd as Prime Minister. Many Fijian newspapers endorsed Abbott for the election, with the Fiji Sun printing an editorial titled "Abbott for PM".

Notes

References

Further reading

External links

 Antony Green's 2013 Federal election calendar
 Antony Green's 2013 Federal election calculator
 Political parties registered for the 2013 federal election at the Australian Electoral Commission
 Election downloads, including Senate group voting tickets, electorates, parties, etc. at the Australian Electoral Commission
 Australia's Rudd concedes election defeat to conservative leader Abbott – article describing the situation after 80% counted (yahoo)

Federal elections in Australia
2013 elections in Australia
September 2013 events in Australia